John Edgar Collins (May 4, 1892 – December 19, 1983) was an American Major League Baseball outfielder.

Biography
He was born on May 4, 1892 in Brooklyn, New York.

In 281 games over five seasons, Collins posted a .253 batting average (232-for-916) with 124 runs, 2 home runs and 63 RBI. He recorded a .946 fielding percentage playing at all three outfield positions.

He died on December 19, 1983, aged 91, in Manassas, Virginia.

References

Major League Baseball outfielders
Philadelphia Athletics players
Boston Braves players
Pittsburgh Pirates players
Baseball players from New York (state)
Mansfield Brownies players
New Castle Nocks players
Sharon Travelers players
San Antonio Bronchos players
Buffalo Bisons (minor league) players
Rochester Hustlers players
Columbus Senators players
1892 births
1983 deaths
Burials at the Cemetery of the Holy Rood